Johannes Dümichen (15 October 1833,  Weißholz bei Großglogau7 February 1894, Strasbourg) was a German Egyptologist.

Biography
Dümichen was born near Glogau. He studied philology and theology in Berlin and Breslau. Subsequently he became a pupil of Karl Lepsius and Heinrich Brugsch, and devoted himself to the study of Egyptian inscriptions. He travelled widely in Egypt, and published his results in a number of important books.

He was tasked by the Prussian government to explore the Nile Valley in 1862 and 1868. On the first expedition (1862–65), along with investigations of the Nile Valley in Egypt, he also conducted extensive research in Nubia and the Sudan. In 1869 he accompanied the Prussian Crown Prince to Egypt on the occasion of the opening of the Suez Canal. On his fourth trip to Egypt (1875), he studied the inscriptions of the largest private tomb in the Theban Necropolis.

He was elected to the American Philosophical Society in 1869.

In 1872 he was chosen professor of Egyptology at Strasbourg, where a new chair was created to compete with the famous chair of Egyptology at the Collège de France.

Works
The value of his work consists not only in the stores of material which he collected, but also in the success with which he dealt with many of the problems raised by the inscriptions. Among his works are:
 Bauurkunde des Tempels von Dendera (1865) – Book on the Dendera Temple complex.
 Geographische Inschriften altägyptischer Denkmähler (4 vols., 1865 1885) – Geographical inscriptions of ancient Egyptian monuments.
 Altägyptische Kalenderinschriften (1866) – Egyptian calendar inscriptions.
 Altägypt. Tempelinschriften (2 vols., 1867) – Ancient Egypt, temple inscriptions. 
 Historische Inschriften altägypt. Denkmäler (2 vols., 1867-1869) –  Historical inscriptions of ancient Egyptian monuments.
 Die kalendarischen Opferfestlisten von Medinet-Habu (1881) – The calendar on the Festival of Sacrifice in the Temple of Medinet Habu.
 Die Oasen der libyschen Wüste. Straßburg (1877) – The oases of the Libyan Desert. 
 Geschichte des alten Aegypten (1879) – History of ancient Egypt. 
 Der Grabpalast des Patuamenap in der thebanischen Nekropolis (1884–1894). The grave palace of Pediamenopet in the Theban Necropolis. 
 Band 1: Inschriften über Titel und Würden der Verstorbenen und Verzeichnis der alljährlichen Todtenfesttage. Leipzig 1884 UB Heidelberg.
 Band 2: Darstellungen und Inschriften der Zimmer V, IV, III. Leipzig 1885 UB Heidelberg.
 Band 3. Leipzig 1894 UB Heidelberg.
The last work, originally intended to comprise six volumes, was left unfinished at Dümichen's death. Part 3 was published after his death by Wilhelm Spiegelberg.

Notes

References
 Johannes Dümichen bibliography de.Wikisource.

1833 births
1894 deaths
German Egyptologists
People from Głogów
People from the Province of Silesia
Humboldt University of Berlin alumni
University of Breslau alumni
Academic staff of the University of Strasbourg
German male non-fiction writers